The rue Charlemagne is a street in the 4th arrondissement of Paris, in the Saint-Gervais quarter, near the Saint-Paul quarter.

External links